Saint-Avertin Sports Football is a French association football club founded in 1924. They are based in the town of Saint-Avertin and their home stadium is the Stade des Grands Champs. As of the 2009–10 season, the club plays in the Division d'Honneur Regionale de Centre, the seventh tier of French football.

External links
Saint-Avertin Sports Football official website 

Football clubs in France
Association football clubs established in 1924
1924 establishments in France
Sport in Indre-et-Loire
Football clubs in Centre-Val de Loire